The 1955 New York Giants season was the franchise's 73rd season. The team finished in third place in the National League with an 80–74 record, 18½ games behind the Brooklyn Dodgers. The season ended with the Phillies turning a triple play with the winning run at home plate.

Offseason 
 Prior to 1955 season: Marshall Bridges was acquired from the Giants by the Milwaukee Braves.

Regular season

Season standings

Record vs. opponents

Opening Day lineup

Roster

Player stats

Batting

Starters by position 
Note: Pos = Position; G = Games played; AB = At bats; H = Hits; Avg. = Batting average; HR = Home runs; RBI = Runs batted in

Other batters 
Note: G = Games played; AB = At bats; H = Hits; Avg. = Batting average; HR = Home runs; RBI = Runs batted in

Pitching

Starting pitchers 
Note: G = Games pitched; IP = Innings pitched; W = Wins; L = Losses; ERA = Earned run average; SO = Strikeouts

Other pitchers 
Note: G = Games pitched; IP = Innings pitched; W = Wins; L = Losses; ERA = Earned run average; SO = Strikeouts

Relief pitchers 
Note: G = Games pitched; W = Wins; L = Losses; SV = Saves; ERA = Earned run average; SO = Strikeouts

Awards and honors 
 Alvin Dark, Lou Gehrig Memorial Award

Farm system 

LEAGUE CHAMPIONS: Minneapolis, Danville, St. Cloud; LEAGUE CO-CHAMPIONS: SandersvilleWilkes-Barre franchise transferred to Johnstown and renamed, July 1, 1955

Notes

References 
 1955 New York Giants at Baseball Reference
 1955 New York Giants at Baseball Almanac

New York Giants (NL)
San Francisco Giants seasons
New York Giants season
1955 in sports in New York City
1950s in Manhattan
Washington Heights, Manhattan